Marienstatt Abbey (German: Abtei Marienstatt,  Latin: Abbatia Loci Sanctae Mariæ) is a Cistercian monastery and a pilgrimage site in Streithausen, Westerwaldkreis, Rhineland-Palatinate, in the Nister valley near Hachenburg.

The abbey has an early-Gothic Basilica with the largest organ in the Westerwald, a library, a brewery with restaurant, a shop for books and art, a guest house, and a privately supported secondary school, the Privates Gymnasium Marienstatt.

History 

The abbey was established by Heisterbach Abbey, which was created by Himmerod Abbey, which in turn was founded from Clairvaux Abbey in 1134, in a direct succession. In 1212, it was first founded in Neunkhausen, made possible by a donation from Eberhard of Arenberg and his wife Adelheid von Molsberg. The site was abandoned because of the climate and soil, and the monastery was transferred to the present location in 1222. According to legend, the abbot had a dream of a hawthorn bush that flowered in winter, which led him to choose the new site. The first church there was consecrated on 27 December 1227 under Conrad, the third abbot. The monastery at the time belonged to the Diocese of Cologne.

From 1476, lay people were permitted to attend services in the abbey church, and in 1485 the pilgrimage day was made the octave of Corpus Christi. From 1561, the Counts of Sayn introduced the Reformation in their territories. In the Thirty Years' War, Sweden claimed the property as Swedish crown land on 3 October 1633, expelling the brothers and vandalizing the premises. Some brothers returned when the Swedes left. However, abbot Johannes Wittig lived with only one brother and one novice there in 1637. After the war, the monastery flourished again, and most present buildings were erected. Under abbot Benedikt Bach, the church was decorated in Baroque style. The old buildings were demolished and replaced from 1735 to 1751 under Petrus Emons.

The monastery served as an infirmary during the War of the First Coalition in 1794/95 and 1796/97. On 19 October 1802, the abbey was dissolved as part of secularisation and was given to Frederick William, Prince of Nassau-Weilburg. The last brothers left in 1803, but Catholic masses were still held. From 1831, masses were officially tolerated by the Nassau government, when the abbey church became the church of a new parish, Marienstatt, saving it from demolition. In 1842, Nassau County bought the buildings back in poor condition, but plans for a workhouse were not carried out. On 18 May 1864 the county sold Marienstatt to the Bishop of Limburg, who established a home for neglected boys. It was directed by members of the Congregation of the Holy Spirit. When the order was dissolved during the 1873 Kulturkampf, diocesan priests took over. They were supported by sisters of the Poor Handmaids of Jesus Christ. Eventually, the institution was moved to Kloster Marienhausen in Aulhausen. In 1888, the abbey was bought back by brothers of the Wettingen-Mehrerau Abbey.

In 1909, abbot Konrad II Kolb built a library and in 1910 opened an Oblatenschule, a school for the preparation of young men for the order. During the Nazi regime, the abbey was almost closed. During World War II, it served again as an infirmary, and as a home for children from Dormagen, senior citizens from Frankfurt am Main, and the Jesuit college Sankt Georgen.

After the war, the school was reopened and expanded into a gymnasium with boarding facility, . The former boarding house is now a guest house, with school rooms in the basement. The church belongs to the state of Rhineland-Palatinate, while the other buildings belong to the Cistercian abbey. In 2015, the parish was merged into a larger parish, Maria Himmelfahrt Hachenburg.

Church organ
In the 16th century, the church had an organ installed in a Schwalbennest on the north wall. At the end of the 18th century, a large organ was on a balcony in front of the west window. In 1854, Daniel Raßmann from Möttau replaced it with an instrument with 16 stops on two manuals and pedal, reusing some material from the former instrument. The organ and the balcony were demolished in 1941 when the church was restored.

A choir organ served the chorale singing from 1912, with 45 stops. During the restoration, it was relocated to the parish hall. In 1950, Anton Feith from Paderborn used material from this organ to build a new instrument. It was sold to the parish St. Peter (Köln-Neuehrenfeld) in 1964, while the abbey church used a small rented organ.

The present organ was built from 1969 to 1970 by Franz Rieger. The organ features the only authentic Spanische Trompete outside Spain, dating back to 1732. The organ was expanded in 2006 and 2007 by Orgelbau Romanus Seifert & Sohn from Kevelaer. In 2015, the organ was expanded by three stops. It now has 67 stops (more than 5,000 pipes) on four manuals and pedal, the largest organ in the region.

Gallery

Literature 
 R. Goerz (ed.): Die Abteikirche zu Marienstatt bei Hachenburg. Wiesbaden 1867. dilibri Rheinland-Pfalz
 Hermann Josef Roth: Die Abtei Marienstatt und die Generalkapitel der Zisterzienser seit 1459. In: Archiv für mittelrheinische Kirchengeschichte. 22, 1970, pp. 93–127.
 Abtei Marienstatt (ed.): 750 Jahre Abteikirche Marienstatt. Buch- und Kunstverlag Abtei Marienstatt, Marienstatt 1977.
 Abtei Marienstatt (ed.): 100 Jahre Wiederbesiedlung der Abtei Marienstatt 1888–1988. Buch- und Kunstverlag Abtei Marienstatt, Marienstatt 1988.
 Doris Fischer: Die Klosterkirche Marienstatt = Denkmalpflege in Rheinland-Pfalz. Forschungsberichte 4. Wernersche Verlagsgesellschaft, Worms 1999. 
 
 Hermann Josef Roth: Himmerod und Marienstatt. Möglichkeiten eines Vergleichs als methodische Anregung. In: Cistercienser-Chronik. 111, 2, 2004, pp. 205–214, 2 illus., 1 table
 Wilhelm Buschulte: Abtei Marienstatt. Rheinischer Verein für Denkmalpflege und Landschaftsschutz, Cologne 2008, .
 Andreas Lechtape: Kloster Marienstatt. Schnell & Steiner, Regensburg 2005, .
 Wolf-Heino Struck: Das Cistercienserkloster Marienstatt (Westerwald) im Mittelalter. Urkundenregesten, Zinsverzeichnisse und Nekrolog. Historische Kommission für Nassau, Wiesbaden 1965, .
 Katharina Kasper. Schriften. Vol. I. Kevelaer 2001,  (Founder of the Congregation of Poor Handmaids of Jesus Christ).
 Forum Abtei Marienstatt (ed.): Acht Jahrhunderte Abtei Marienstatt. Jubiläum – Äbte – Projekte. Marienstatt 2014. .

Films 
 Virtual flight over the Abbey grounds

References

External links 

 
 
 Archivalia Kloster Marienstatt Hessisches Hauptstaatsarchiv, Wiesbaden

Cistercian monasteries in Germany
Marienstatt
1212 establishments in Europe
Gothic architecture in Germany
Baroque architecture in Rhineland-Palatinate